The Power of Jennifer Rush is a compilation album released by American singer Jennifer Rush.

This was the first official collection released by Rush. As well as featuring her past hits, a new single was released from the collection, "Ave Maria" (originally from her earlier album Movin').

Released in late 1991, the album only reached No.40 in Germany, but sustained a lengthy run on the charts and re-entered in 1995. The collection also peaked within the top 40 in Switzerland and Austria.

A repackaged version of the album, entitled The Platinum Edition was released in 2001 to mark its 10th anniversary.

Track listing 
"Destiny" (Candy de Rouge; Gunther Mende; Jennifer Rush; M. D. Clinic)
"Heart Over Mind" (Taylor Rhodes; Tom Deluca)
"Ave Maria (Survivors of a Different Kind)"
"Ring of Ice"
"The Power of Love"
"Higher Ground"
"Flames of Paradise" (Duet with Elton John)
"25 Lovers"
"I Come Undone"
"Same Heart" (Duet with Michael Bolton)
"If You're Ever Gonna Lose My Love"
"Solitaria Mujer" (Keep All the Fires Burning Bright) [CD Bonus Track]
"Vida de Mi Vida" (You're My One and Only) [CD Bonus Track]

In Spain, the track "If You're Ever Gonna Lose My Love" was featured in Spanish by the name of "No Me Canso De Pensar En Ti (Te Quiero Tanto)", replacing the original English version on the track list.

Charts

Certifications

References

External links

Jennifer Rush albums
1991 compilation albums
Columbia Records compilation albums